The Crimea Railway is a railroad located in Crimea, providing passenger and freight services to Sevastopol and the Republic of Crimea. 

Crimea Railway is a unitary enterprise company independent of Russian Railways, and headquartered in Simferopol. It was founded in 2014 following the Russian annexation of Crimea from units of the Crimean Directorate of the Ukrainian Cisdnieper Railways.

Basic information

The Crimea Railway has three locomotive depots at: Simferopol, Dzhankoy, and Kerch; a carriage depot in Dzhankoy; two carriage depots with facilities for repairs; and one rail car depot in Simferopol. The Crimea Railway does not possess its own railway track machine for laying down new tracks. The Crimea passenger service travels to Moscow, Voronezh and Rostov-on-Don on an inter-modal scheme via a combination of train and ferry.

In November 2014, a railroad cargo ferry across the Kerch Strait reopened with three train ferries in operation: two for the route Caucasus-Crimea and one for Caucasus–Kerch.

History

The territorial predecessor of Crimea Railway was the Crimean Directorate of Cisdnieper Railways, the regional operator Ukrainian Railways in Ukraine's Dnipropetrovsk Oblast, Zaporizhya Oblast, Kharkiv Oblast, Kherson Oblast and the Autonomous Republic of Crimea. On 26 March 2014, a month after the 2014 Russian annexation of Crimea, the Crimean authorities of the new Republic of Crimea established Crimea Railway as a publicly owned company (a unitary enterprise in Russia) and the city of Sevastopol. In Spring 2014, railway equipment was exported from Crimea to mainland Ukraine, including passenger locomotives, track machines and new cars. The parts of the Crimean Directorate in the Kherson Oblast and Zaporizhya Oblast of Ukraine were transferred to the Zaporizhia Directorate of Cisdnieper Railways. The seized trains of the reassigned railway were painted over, with the emblem of Ukraine and the logo of Ukrainian Railways replaced by the emblem of the Republic of Crimea and the abbreviation "CR", but the blue and yellow colors were preserved. On passenger cars, the code of registry was amended from 045,046 to 085.

In October 2014, inspectors conducted a survey of Crimea and concluded that the structures of rail tracks and turnouts were in poor condition. As a result, the maximum speed was reduced to 40 km/h, 25 km/h, and occasionally 10 km/h.

Stations
 Feodosia railway station 
 Armyansk railway station
 Dzhankoy railway station
 Vladislavovka railway station
 Kerch railway station
 Port Krym railway station
 Simferopol railway station
 Yevpatoria railway station

References

External links
 

Transport in Crimea
Railway companies established in 2014
2014 establishments in Russia
Federal State Unitary Enterprises of Russia
Companies based in Crimea
Railway companies of Russia